Alice Sarah Tyler (April 27, 1859 – April 18, 1944) was an American librarian and advocate.

Personal life
Tyler was born in Decatur, Illinois, to John W. and Sarah Roney Tyler and was a descendant of President James Monroe and John Tyler. She never married and shared an apartment with her friend and colleague Bessie Sargeant-Smith until her death in 1944.

Career
Alice S. Tyler graduated from the Armour Institute of Technology (now the Illinois Institute of Technology) in Chicago in 1894.  In 1895 she became the first library school graduate on staff at the Cleveland Public Library, where she worked as head of the Catalog Division. From 1900-1913 she served as secretary of the Iowa State Library Commission where she improved existing libraries and established new ones. According to Stuart (2013), “Under Tyler’s leadership, public libraries in Iowa flourished as she oversaw the education of librarians, the expansion of the traveling library system, and the increase of libraries from 41 to 113"(p. 91). She started a summer school at the Iowa State University and served as director from 1901-1912.

In reflecting on Tyler’s period in Iowa, Stuart (2013) maintains that “Alice S. Tyler’s thirteen-year tenure in Iowa left a state that had a stronger, more fully developed library system, with more trained librarians, more libraries, and more library buildings. The new library buildings, the vast majority of which were funded by Carnegie grants, were the most visible aspect of the state’s library growth. The documentation indicates that as secretary of the ILC, Tyler did not specifically support or promote that funding. Instead, it is evident that Tyler quickly believed that the Carnegie-funded buildings represented two potential liabilities for Iowa’s communities: the buildings were often designed with poor functionality, and Carnegie’s stipulation of 10 percent support meant that the libraries were essentially underfunded for further growth and development. Despite Tyler’s quiet opposition to Carnegie library grants during the main years of her position as Secretary and Regional Contact for the Iowa State Library Commission, in December 1908 she received requests by people in Oklahoma and South Dakota seeking Carnegie grants to fund their library plans. Her response to these requests contained important information and relevant publications about the process and advantages of Carnegie funding which, when reviewed, it was noted that she had never provided to the Iowa communities. As it was never politically expedient for Tyler to criticize the potential of Carnegie funding, she attempted in her various writings to mitigate these potentially negative consequences. Unfortunately, her writings also reveal how little influence she had, as Iowa’s communities ultimately received the fourth highest number of Carnegie-funded buildings in the country. Ironically, the development of Iowa’s libraries occurred despite Tyler’s unrelieved misgivings regarding the benefits of Carnegie’s largesse” (p. 106).”

1900-1913: Library Funding in Davenport, Iowa 
An example of one of the quiet controversies that arose from Andrew Carnegie's cultural mission of funding of libraries occurred in Davenport, Iowa when Carnegie empowered his personal secretary, James Bertram (Carnegie secretary), to establish the eligibility requirements for a community to receive funding, which Alice S. Tyler quietly but strongly objected to. According to Shana S. Stuart (2013), during the time that Tyler served as the first secretary of the Iowa Library Commission (October 1900 through August 1913), the growth of free public libraries increased from 41 to 113, with 84 of these built from the grants provided by Carnegie. Previously, library funding came from local sources which Tyler preferred over outside sources. Although Tyler did not openly campaign against the Carnegie grants, she, nevertheless, engaged in a quiet opposition to the communities’ acceptance of these funds for several primary reasons. In order to receive the grants, the communities were required to donate a building site for the construction and contractually agree to provide a subvention of 10% of whatever Carnegie funding was granted for a period of 10 years. Tyler perceived that the grants and the financial subvention were insufficient to allow for the adequate growth and expansion she envisioned for the Iowa State Libraries. The conflict of interests between Tyler and the various state officials and community entities agreeing with the Carnegie requirements extended to issues regarding library design, functionality, and services. While Tyler’s objections remained muted throughout, she clearly stated her views about the negative consequences of widespread, unmonitored acceptance of the Carnegie grants. Stuart (2013) also notes that the provisions of the arrangement between the communities and Carnegie did not define an oversight, consultancy, or approval role for Tyler. In fact, over the years, any suggestions Tyler made about any aspect of the library constructions were ignored, thus her actual influence on the outcome of the Iowa Free Public Libraries Project was minimal.

Western Reserve University
From 1913-1929 she served as Director of the School of Library Science at Western Reserve University. She became the third woman President of the American Library Association in 1920-1921.  From 1925-1929 she served as Dean of the School of Library Science at Western Reserve University (now Case Western Reserve University). Tyler was appointed Dean Emeritus after her retirement from the University on 13 June 1929.

Publications
Effect of the commission plan of city government on public libraries 1911
Some aspects of library progress 1921
Recruiting for library schools 1922
Education for librarianship: as it is and as it might be 1924
Library extension: a national responsibility 1928
The need for more specialized training for the county librarian 1931

Other accomplishments
Editor of Iowa Library Quarterly 1901-13
President of the Association of American Library Schools 1918-19
President of the Library Club of Cleveland and Vicinity 1922-23
President of the Ohio State Library Association 1922-23
Member of the League of Women Voters (LWV) of Cleveland
Member of Citizens League of Greater Cleveland
President of Women’s City Club, Cleveland

Further reading
AALS: The Lost Years 1925-1928 by Donald G. Davis, Jr. and Florence R. Curtis
American Librarianship: Some Women by William J. Hamilton

References

 
 

1859 births
1944 deaths
American librarians
American women librarians
People from Decatur, Illinois
Presidents of the American Library Association